Ana María Archila (born 1978/1979)  is an immigrant rights, worker justice, LGBTQ rights, and women's rights advocate who ran for Lieutenant Governor of New York. She was formerly the co-executive director of the Center for Popular Democracy (CPD) and a co-founder and co-executive director of Make the Road New York and Make the Road Action.

In New York, she fought for years so that every young person would be able to access high-quality education–helping lead campaigns to fully fund public schools, create school-based college access programs, and pass the New York Dream Act. She was also deeply involved in the fights for paid sick days, raising the minimum wage, and a range of other economic, racial, and justice campaigns. In New York and nationally, she has been a leader in the fight for humane immigration reform.

Archila received national attention when she confronted former Arizona Senator Jeff Flake just before the Senate Judiciary Committee's vote for Supreme Court nominee Brett Kavanaugh, leading to a delay in the process. She joined Congresswoman Alexandria Ocasio-Cortez as a guest of honor at the 2019 State of the Union.

Early life
Archila was born and raised in Bogotá, Colombia. At the age of 17, Archila moved to the United States.

Career

She attended Montclair State University before becoming a staff member of the Latin American Integration Center (LAIC) in Staten Island and Queens. The founding director of LAIC, Sara Maria Archila, was a former human rights lawyer from Colombia and her aunt.

Latin American Integration Center
After Sara María Archila died from cancer, Ana María became the executive director of LAIC.  She began serving in this role in 2003, where she led the organization to deliver crucial services and organize for immigrant rights, as well as becoming a spokesperson about the needs of Latino immigrant communities in New York state. Archila advocated on behalf of parents with limited English language skills in Staten Island and Queens, New York, to obtain more information about their children's education. After LAIC merged with Make the Road by Walking to become Make the Road New York (MRNY), she become a co-executive director of the new organization. Under the leadership of Archila and her co-directors, MRNY became the largest grassroots immigrant organization in New York City.

Center for Popular Democracy
Archila subsequently became a co-executive director of the Center for Popular Democracy (CPD). She worked to build and support this national network of community organizations. In her role, Archila spoke out against the immigration policies of US President Donald Trump, as well as his attacks on the Affordable Care Act, and more.  She told CNN that removing children from their parents and their family would cause damage that would be difficult to repair later in life.  She continued her decades-long work advocating for immigration reform centered on a path to citizenship for millions of undocumented people.  In June 2018, Archila lamented that the zero tolerance policy of the Trump administration which separated immigrant children from their parents, was still in operation.

Archila brought attention to Puerto Rico and problems of lack of power after Hurricane Maria. She warned that the territory was lacking in proper governmental organization in advance of the following hurricane season.  She advocated for debt relief to alleviate economic problems in Puerto Rico. Archila pointed in particular to Bank of Santander as an example of economic debt pressures on Puerto Rico in the wake of Hurricane Maria. Archila said Puerto Rico was not getting responsive assistance from the US federal government, because the United States Congress did not view the locality as within their representation duties.

U.S. Senate hearings on Supreme Court nomination

On September 28, 2018, US Senator Jeff Flake announced his intention to vote for Supreme Court nominee Brett Kavanaugh, who had been accused of sexual assault by a number of women, including Christine Blasey Ford, who testified for several hours before the Senate Judiciary Committee the day before Flake's announcement. Kavanaugh subsequently testified and denied the allegations. Flake said that Ford's testimony was "compelling," but added that Kavanaugh's response was "persuasive" and left him "with as much doubt as certainty" regarding what had occurred.

Following his announcement, Flake was confronted by Archila along with Maria Gallagher, two anti-Kavanaugh protestors, in a Senate office building elevator. On the same day, Flake voted not to subpoena Mark Judge to appear before the Judiciary Committee, who Ford said was present during her assault.  That afternoon, Flake voted to advance Kavanaugh's nomination out of the Senate Judiciary Committee, but said he was a "yes" vote "only if the final Senate vote [was] delayed for one week, during which time the FBI [could] investigate sexual harassment allegations against Kavanaugh"; Senate Republican leaders agreed to support the proposed investigation.  Later that day, President Donald Trump directed the FBI to undertake a one-week investigation of the allegations against Kavanaugh.

2022 New York lieutenant governor campaign

In 2022 Archila was selected by Jumaane Williams to be his running mate in the 2022 New York gubernatorial election. Archila's campaign is dedicated to standing up for the rights, dignity and safety of working people, and to giving all working New Yorkers an independent voice that represents their experiences and needs in Albany.

Archilla received endorsements from dozens of other elected officials and advocacy groups across the state, including the Working Families Party, Rep. Jamaal Bowman, Rep. Nydia Velázquez, and New York City Comptroller Brad Lander. She was also endorsed by Rep. Alexandria Ocasio-Cortez. In the Democratic primary, Archilla finished second in a three-person race which was won by the incumbent, Antonio Delgado.

References

Further reading

External links

Living people
People from Queens, New York
Activists for Hispanic and Latino American civil rights
Colombian emigrants to the United States
Montclair State University alumni
20th-century Colombian women
21st-century Colombian women
21st-century American politicians
Date of birth missing (living people)
Place of birth missing (living people)
Year of birth missing (living people)